Banana is one of the fruit crops produced in Taiwan. It has been essential part of the agriculture in Taiwan, as they are the country's most essential fruit. It is common for Japanese consumers to purchase bananas from Taiwan.

History
The banana production begin to grow when Taiwan was being occupied by Japan. Taiwan bananas monopolized the Japanese market until 1963 when banana importation was liberalized in Japan. In 1967, banana exports from the country were relatively high. Since 1970, the industry has declined significantly due to competition from the Philippines and problems with the cultivation.

Agricultural land
Around 8,000 hectares of land in Taiwan is used for banana cultivation. About 5,000 hectares in Southern Taiwan is used for exports and about 3,000 hectares in Northern Taiwan is used for domestic consumption.

In 1991, the geographic distribution for banana cultivation land was Kaohsiung County (2,284 hectares), Changhua County, Nantou County, Taichung County (1,862 hectares), Pingtung County (1,254 hectares), Chiayi County, Tainan County, Yunlin County (185 hectares) and Hualien County, Taitung County (108 hectares).

Economy
The main export destination of banana from Taiwan is Japan which peaked in 1967 with 416,000 tons of export. In 1990, the export tonnage declined to 48,000 tons.

Research centers 
The Taiwan Banana Research Institute is tasked to undergo research and development of banana cultivation in Taiwan.

See also
 Agriculture in Taiwan
 Banana industry
 Floriculture in Taiwan

References

Horticulture in Taiwan
Banana production